The Seafarer 48 is an American sailboat that was designed by Sparkman & Stephens as a racer-cruiser and first built in 1969. It is S&S design #1956.

The boat was introduced at the 1969 New York Boat Show and was named Queen of the Show. It was one of the largest sailboats seen at the show.

The Seafarer 48 design was developed into the Hughes 48 and the Northstar 48.

Production
The design was built by Seafarer Yachts in the United States, starting in 1969, but it is now out of production. It was the largest boat built by Seafarer, but fewer than five boats were likely built in total.

Design
The Seafarer 48 is a recreational keelboat, built predominantly of fiberglass, with wood trim. It has a masthead yawl rig; a raked stem; a raised counter, angled transom; a skeg-mounted rudder controlled by a wheel and a fixed, swept fin keel. It displaces  and carries  of ballast.

The boat is fitted with an inboard engine for docking and maneuvering.

Operational history
This is a large mosaic showing the boat at an office building in Huntington, New York, where the Seafarer Yachts plant was once located.

See also
List of sailing boat types

References

External links
Photo of a Seafarer 48

Keelboats
1960s sailboat type designs
Sailing yachts 
Sailboat type designs by Sparkman and Stephens
Sailboat types built by Seafarer Yachts